Admiral Molyneux Shuldham, 1st Baron Shuldham ( – 30 September 1798) was an officer of the British Royal Navy. He served for a time as colonial governor of Newfoundland.

Family and early life
Molyneux Shuldham was born in Ireland c. 1717, and was the second son of the Reverend Lemuel Shuldham, by his wife Elizabeth, daughter of Daniel Molyneux of Ballymulvy, of County Longford. Molyneux entered the navy in 1732 as captain's servant on board , with Captain George Forbes (afterwards Earl of Granard and governor of County Longford). He passed his examination on 25 January 1739, being then described on his certificate as 'near twenty-two.' According to the statement in Charnock, he was not seventeen.

In 1742 he was first lieutenant of her when, on 21 September, she was set on fire in a drunken squabble between a marine and the purser's boy and burnt, with a large proportion of the ship's company. Shuldham, with the captain and other officers, was tried by court-martial on 15 October but was acquitted of all blame.

Command
On 9 November 1745 he was attacked and captured by two Spanish privateers off the Black River, after stiff resistance. Shuldham suffered mistreatment by privateers, but was compensated by the Spanish governor of Havana.

Seven Years' War
War had not then been declared, but hostilities had been going on for several months, as Shuldham very well knew, and the story that he mistook the enemy's ships of war for merchantmen would be but little to his credit if there was any reason to suppose it true. He, with the crew of the Warwick, was sent to France, kept a prisoner at large at Poitiers for nearly two years, and returned to England in a cartel on 16 March 1758.

In July he was moved by Moore into , which was lost on a reef of rocks at Fort Royal off Martinique as she was standing in to engage a battery on 8 January 1762, when the island was attacked and reduced by Rear-Admiral Rodney. In mid-1763 he was transferred once more to a temporary command aboard , with which he returned to England in August 1763.

Governor of Newfoundland
On 14 February 1772 he was appointed commodore and commander-in-chief on the Newfoundland Station, which office he held for three years. He was responsible for the construction of Fort Townshend, which was completed in 1780. Shuldham visited Chateau Bay on the Labrador coast and sent his lieutenant, Roger Curtis, to inspect the northern coast and the Moravian missionaries.

Flag rank
On 31 March 1775 he was promoted to be rear-admiral of the white. At the general election in the following autumn he was returned to the House of Commons as member for Fowey, and on 29 September, was appointed commander-in-chief on the coast of North America from the river St. Lawrence to Cape Florida. He went out with his flag in the 50-gun , arriving at Boston on 30 December after a passage of sixty-one days, having been promoted, on 7 December while on the way out, to be vice-admiral of the blue. His work was limited to covering the operations of the troops, and preventing the colonial trade. In July 1776, he escorted Admiral Howe into New York Harbor. He was replaced by Lord Howe, and on 31 July, was created a peer of Ireland by the title of Baron Shuldham. Early in 1777 he returned to England, and from 1778 to 1783 was Commander-in-Chief, Plymouth. He was elected a Fellow of the Royal Society in 1777. He was promoted on 24 September 1787 to be admiral of the blue, and on 1 February 1793 to be admiral of the white.

He died at Lisbon in the autumn of 1798.  His body was transported back to England aboard , which was also carrying many of the antique vases collected by Sir William Hamilton. Colossus was wrecked in a gale on the Isles of Scilly, but while many of Sir William's vases were lost, Shuldham's body was recovered through 'heroic efforts'. He had married Margaret Irene, widow of John Harcourt of Ankerwycke Park but left no issue, and thus the title became extinct.

References

External links
Biography at Government House The Governorship of Newfoundland and Labrador

|-

|-

1710s births
1798 deaths
Politicians from County Longford
Governors of Newfoundland Colony
Barons in the Peerage of Ireland
Peers of Ireland created by George III
Royal Navy admirals
Members of the Parliament of Great Britain for constituencies in Cornwall
British MPs 1774–1780
Fellows of the Royal Society